Majestic Hôtel-Spa is a French luxury hotel that is located at 30 rue La Pérouse in the 16th arrondissement of Paris. It belongs to Les Hôtels Baverez.

History 
The original Hôtel Majestic was built by Léonard Tauber and opened in 1908 as the second hotel of what is now the Baverez hotel group. It was located on the other side of rue La Pérouse in the building that is now known as The Peninsula Paris hotel. That building was purchased by the French government in 1936 to serve as offices for the Ministry of War. (The French government sold that building to Katara Hospitality in 2007 as part of a cost-cutting measure. It was then completely renovated, and it opened as The Peninsula Paris in August 2014.)

The building at 30 rue La Pérouse was inaugurated in February 2010 under the name of Hôtel Majestic Villa. The name was subsequently changed to Majestic Hôtel-Spa.

Characteristics 
Majestic Hôtel-Spa is a five-star hotel that counts 52 rooms, including 24 suites. The hotel has a spa, a bar Le PremiuM, and a restaurant Le MagnuM.

The spa MAJClub is equipped with a swimming pool, a fitness center, saunas, hammams and treatment rooms.

References

External links
 

Hotels in Paris
Buildings and structures in the 16th arrondissement of Paris